Mera Pind (English: My village) is a Punjabi film released on 20 September 2008, directed and produced Manmohan Singh. The film stars Harbhajan Mann, Navjot Singh Sidhu, Kimi Verma and Gurpreet Ghuggi.

Plot 
Mera Pind is the story of a well-to-do Non-resident Indian Navjot 
Singh sidhu, who is played by Navjot Sidhu, who has chosen to settle in his native village and spread the message of empowerment and entrepreneurship among the village youth. Led by Himmat, played by Harbhajan Maan, the youth set off a revolution in the development of the village. The story inspires Punjabis who are increasingly opting to settle abroad, to undertake business in their own villages and cities. Mera Pind also includes a story of a young man seeking his love but has been shielded from the father of the woman he loves.

Cast 
 Navjot Sidhu
 Harbhajan Mann
 Kimi Varma
 Gugu Gill
 Sarabjit Mangat
 Deep Dhillon
 Navneet Nishan
 Sheeba Bhakri
 Rana Ranbir
 Gurpreet Ghuggi
 Darshan Aulakh
 Goldy Mann

Box office 
Mera Pind was successful at the box office, both domestically and overseas. In Punjab it broke the record of the highest opening for a Punjabi film, grossing 50 lakhs over its first weekend. Overseas the film had a limited release but did "extraordinary" business as it grossed 55 lakhs in the United Kingdom, 75 lakhs in North America and broke another record for the three-day total grossing 1.55 crore nett from just 25 prints. The film grossed a worldwide total of 2.75 crore nett from two weeks and was declared a Blockbuster.

Music 
 "Mera Pind" - Harbhajan Mann
 "Geda Cheda" - Harbhajan Mann, Rani Randeep
 "College" - Harbhajan Mann
 "Bhul Jaaye" - Harbhajan Mann
 "Jatt" - Harbhajan Mann, Labh Janjua
 "Chan Naal" - Harbhajan Mann, Rani Randeep
 "Bharavaan" - Harbhajan Mann
 "Dhaaba" - Harbhajan Mann, Rana Ranbir

References

External links 
 

2008 films
2008 romantic comedy films
Indian romantic musical films
Punjabi-language Indian films
2000s Punjabi-language films